The Combined Joint Expeditionary Force (CJEF) is an Anglo-French military force. It draws upon both the British Armed Forces and the French Armed Forces to field a deployable force with land, air and maritime components together with command and control and supporting logistics.

Background 
The Combined Joint Expeditionary Force (or CJEF) is envisaged as a deployable, combined Anglo-French military force for use in a wide range of crisis scenarios, up to and including high intensity combat operations. As a joint force it involves all three armed services: a land component composed of formations at national brigade level, maritime and air components with their associated headquarters, together with logistics and support functions.

The CJEF is not conceived as a standing force; instead, is available at short notice for UK-French bilateral, NATO, European Union, United Nations or other operations. Combined air and land exercises commenced during 2011 with a view towards developing a full capability. The CJEF is also seen as a potential stimulus towards greater interoperability and coherence in military doctrine, training and equipment requirements.

The UK and French defence ministries have jointly produced a User Guide (in English) to assist military staff operating at the operational and higher tactical levels of CJEF operations. This guide, jointly developed by the Development, Concepts and Doctrine Centre at Shrivenham, UK, and the Centre Interarmées de Concepts, de Doctrine et d'Expérimentations in Paris, has been published on the French Ministry of Defence website.

History and development 

In 2010, the governments of the UK and France signed the Lancaster House Treaties which committed both governments to the creation of an Anglo-French Combined Joint Expeditionary Force (CJEF). This was outlined as follows:

In 2012, the UK-France Summit revealed further information on the CJEF. The two governments reaffirmed their commitments, stating that their recent expeditionary operations in Libya had proven the CJEF's relevance. It was announced that the CJEF would be operational from 2016 and that it would be "an early entry force capable of facing multiple threats up to the highest intensity". The two governments also agreed to continue the development of a joint maritime task group force which would be available by 2020 and comprise maritime assets owned by both countries. A joint exercise, named Exercise Corsican Lion, was also announced to test and further develop the CJEF, which subsequently took place in October 2012.

In 2013, a large-scale joint amphibious exercise in the Red Sea, named Exercise Djibouti Lion, was cancelled. British Defence Minister Mark Francois stated that it was cancelled due to "administrative issues" and not due to a lack of resources as the media had reported.

During the 2014 UK-France Summit, both governments announced that "good progress" was being made on the delivery of the CJEF. The creation of an integrated national Joint Task Force Headquarters was announced, as well as a Combined Logistics Support Group to sustain the CJEF. Two major exercises to take place in 2015 and 2016 were also announced.

In April 2016, Exercise Griffin Strike began to take place in the UK involving up to 5,000 personnel. It was dubbed the CJEF's "biggest development test" by the UK Ministry of Defence and involved land, air and sea components. Typhoon fighters of the Royal Air Force and Rafale fighters of the French Air Force were deployed to RAF Leeming in North Yorkshire. On land, elements of the British Army’s 3rd (UK) Division and the French Army's 7th Mechanised Brigade, including paratroopers, armoured units and infantrymen, came together.

Structure of CJEF

Role
The CJEF comprises strategic, operational and tactical level Command and Control elements, together with deployable sea, land, air and logistical components.

It is seen as being able to conduct offensive and defensive operations on land, in the air, and at sea. It is designed to be rapidly deployable and, once ready in theatre, to be sustainable for up to three months of operations as a stand-alone force; as well as having the ability to include other nations as coalition partners. The UK and France see the following as the most likely tasks for the CJEF:
 crisis management, involving early entry into a potentially hostile territory (including the initial enforcement of no-fly zones, embargoes and sanctions);
 the protection of shared national interests abroad;
 extraction operations;
 non-combatant evacuation operations;
 the temporary strengthening of a peacekeeping operation;
 support to emergency humanitarian assistance.

Command & Control 
At the strategic level Command and Control (C2) is exercised via a CJEF Current Commitments Team (CCT) which takes its direction jointly from the UK's Chief of the Defence Staff and France's Chef d’État Major des Armées.

The CJEF CCT provides strategic military direction to the CJEF Operational Headquarters (OHQ) which, depending on circumstances, is to be based either in the UK at PJHQ Northwood or in France at Fort Mont-Valérien.

The OHQ carries out operational level planning with the conduct of the operation being commanded by the deployed tactical headquarters the Combined Joint Force Headquarters (CJFHQ). The C2 arrangements are summarised as follows:

 Strategic level – CJEF Current Commitments Team (CCT)
 Operational level – CJEF Operational Headquarters (OHQ)
 Tactical level – deployable Combined Joint Force Headquarters (CJFHQ), and as required:
 Combined Logistics Support Group (CLSG) headquarters.
 Maritime component commander.
 Land component commander.
 Air component commander.

Deployable Components 
The CJEF is planned to be able to deploy maritime, land, and air components with the CJFHQ commanding these either directly or via individual component commanders.

 A maritime component of up to a naval task group based on one or more capital ships, with the maritime forces required to conduct a particular CJEF operation being primarily depend on the circumstances. The component may include any combination of UK and French maritime assets gathered in a task group, and commanded from a UK/French combined headquarters that could be led by either nation.
 A scalable land component of at least a UK battle-group and a French battle-group. It is to be capable of conducting non-enduring, complex intervention operations, facing multiple threats up to high intensity. It is planned as a high-readiness force using existing national high readiness force elements – including lead elements at very short notice.
 An air component comprising an expeditionary air wing that is  self-sufficient and capable of being generated within 10 days of activation. This will include all air assets across the full spectrum of air power roles. It is envisaged that the air component will be able to deliver the full spectrum of air effects.
 A logistics component with which the UK and France envisage collaborating to share the logistics support of the CJEF. Cooperative logistic planning is foreseen as commencing at the earliest opportunity and logistic operations will typically be commanded by a Combined Logistics Support Group headquarters, subordinate to the CJTF headquarters.

Relationship to European Union Defence Policy 
While the CJEF may, with both French and UK government agreement, be used for European Union (EU) tasks it is not formally part of the EU's Common Security and Defence Policy. It does not use the separate Lisbon Treaty’s Permanent Structured Cooperation facility, nor involve the European Defence Agency.

See also
Entente frugale
Eurocorps
France–United Kingdom relations
Franco-German Brigade
NATO
Response Force Task Group
UK Joint Expeditionary Force
Joint Rapid Reaction Force
Allied Rapid Reaction Corps
European Intervention Initiative

References 

France–United Kingdom military relations
2010 in France
21st-century military history of the United Kingdom
Expeditionary units and formations
2010 in military history
2010 in the United Kingdom
21st-century military history of France